The 1971 Asia Badminton Championships was the 4th tournament of the Badminton Asia Championships. It was held August 1971 in Jakarta, Indonesia.

Semifinal results 
Scores for Women's singles and doubles unknown.

Final results 
This is the final result of the 1971 Asia Badminton Championships

Medalists

Medal table

References 

Badminton Asia Championships
1971 in badminton
1971 in Indonesian sport
Sports competitions in Jakarta